Richard Charles Roberts (born November 13, 1965) is a Canadian actor. He is known for his work in various films and television.

Early life
Roberts was born in Hamilton, Ontario. He grew up in Edmonton, Alberta. He studied acting at the National Theatre School of Canada in Montreal, graduating in 1991.

Career
He played Donald D'Arby in the series Traders, for which he was nominated for a Gemini Award. He moved briefly to Los Angeles in 1998 appearing in the CBS series  L.A. Doctors alongside Ken Olin and Sheryl Lee. He returned to Canada to star in  An American in Canada, which ran for two seasons.

Most recently, Roberts was featured in Michael McGowan's series Between, guest starred opposite Kim Cattrall in Sensitive Skin (TMN/Movie Central), appeared in Zoom (Pedro Morelli), God and Country (Ken Finkleman) and the miniseries The Book of Negroes (CBC).

Other work includes guest starring roles on Saving Hope (CTV/NBC), Copper (BBC America), Cracked (CBC), Republic of Doyle (CBC), Murdoch Mysteries (CBC), Cra$h & Burn (Showcase), Haven (SyFy), ZOS (Whizbang Films), and was featured regularly in the hit CBC series, This is Wonderland.

He played Dennis MacDonald on Family's Life with Derek, and the role of explorer John Rae in the 2008 docudrama Passage. He also played the role of Jim Jones in Jonestown: Paradise Lost which aired on the History Channel and the Discovery Channel. He also played the evil Brooks in Eloise at Christmastime.

In 2012 he was tapped to play Jack Layton in the CBC biopic Jack, alongside Sook-Yin Lee as Olivia Chow. Jack garnered him a Canadian Screen Award and an ACTRA Award for Best Actor.

He played Matthew in the CBC series This Life.

Theatre
A popular fixture on Canadian stages, Roberts recently headlined the Tarragon Theatre hit, Enemy of the People as well as The Accidental Death of an Anarchist for Soulpepper Theatre Company. Additional theatre credits include the Belfry Theatre's production of Proud, Tuesdays with Morrie, and he made his Stratford Festival debut in the title role of Zastrozzi.

Writing
As a writer, Roberts' work Mimi  (which he co-wrote with Allan Cole and Melody Johnson) premiered at The Tarragon Theatre and was nominated for a Dora Award. His play Kite premiered to critical acclaim earning numerous Dora Award nominations for writing and production. Other writing credits include Nod (Theatre Gargantua) and Fish/Wife (Tarragon Theatre)

Personal life
Roberts is married to Marjorie Campbell, they have two sons.

Filmography

Awards and nominations

References

External links
 

1965 births
Living people
Canadian male film actors
Canadian male television actors
Canadian male voice actors
Canadian Screen Award winners
Male actors from Edmonton
Male actors from Hamilton, Ontario
21st-century Canadian male actors
20th-century Canadian male actors